Anna Louisa Geertruida Bosboom-Toussaint (September 16, 1812April 14, 1886) was a Dutch novelist.

Life and career
Geertruida Toussaint was born in Alkmaar, Netherlands, on 16 September 1812. Her father, a pharmacist of Huguenot descent, gave her a fair education, and at an early period of her career she developed a taste for historical research, fostered by a forced indoor life as a result of weak health.

Her first romance, Almagro, appeared in 1837, followed by De graaf van Devonshire ("The Earl of Devonshire") in 1838; De Engelschen te Rome ("The English at Rome") in 1840, and Het Huis Lauernesse ("The House of Lauernesse") in 1841, an episode of the Reformation that has been translated into many European languages. These stories, mainly founded upon some of the most interesting epochs of Dutch history, betrayed a remarkable grasp of facts and situations, combined with an undoubted mastery over her mother tongue, although her style is sometimes involved and not always faultless.

Ten years (1840–1850) were mainly devoted to further studies, the result of which was revealed in 1851–1854, when she published a series of three novels dealing with the first Earl of Leicester's adventures in the Low Countries. In 1851 she married the Dutch painter, Johannes Bosboom (1817–1891), and thereafter was known as Mrs Bosboom-Toussaint.

After 1870 Geertruida Bosboom-Toussaint abandoned historical romance for the modern society novel, but her Delftsche Wonderdokter ("The Necromancer of Delft", 1871) and Majoor Frans ("Major Frank", 1875) did not command the success of her earlier works. Majoor Frans has been translated into English (1885). Mrs Bosboom-Toussaint's novels have been published in a collected edition (1885–1888). She died in The Hague on 14 April 1886.

Works

 Almagro (1837) 
 De Graaf van Devonshire: romantische épisode uit de jeugd van Elisabeth Tudor ("The Earl of Devonshire, Romantic Episode from Elisabeth Tudor's Youth", 1838) 
 Engelschen te Rome: romantische épisode uit de regering van paus Sixtus V ("The English at Rome, Romantic Episode from Pope Sixtus V's Reign", 1839) 
 Het huis Lauernesse ("The House of Lauernesse", 1840) 
 Lord Edward Glenhouse (1840) 
 De prinses Orsini ("The Princess of Orsini", 1843) 
 Eene kroon voor Karel den Stouten ("A Crown for Charles the Bold", 1842) 
 De graaf van Leycester in Nederland ("The Earl of Leicester in the Netherlands", 1846) 
 Mejonkvrouwe De Mauléon ("Lady De Mauléon", 1848) 
 Don Abbondio II (1849) 
 Het huis Honselaarsdijk in 1638 ("The House of Honselaarsdijk in 1638", 1849) 
 De vrouwen van het Leycestersche tijdvak ("The Women of the Leicesterean Era", 1850) 
 Media-Noche: een tafereel uit den Nijmeegschen vredehandel, 1678 ("Media Noche, a Tableau from the Nijmegen Peace Trade", 1852) 
 Gideon Florensz: romantisch-historische épisode uit het laatste tijdperk van Leycesters bestuur in Nederland ("Gideon Florensz, a Romantic-Historical Episode from the Last of Leicester's Administration in the Netherlands", 1854) 
 Graaf Pepoli: de roman van een rijke edelman ("Count Pepoli, a Rich Nobleman's Tale", 1860) 
 De triomf van Pisani ("Pisani's Triumph", 1861) 
 De verrassing van Hoey in 1595 ("Hoey's Surprise of 1595", 1866) 
 De Delftsche wonderdokter ("The Nectromancer of Delft", 1871) 
 Majoor Frans ("Major Francis", 1875) 
 Raymond de schrijnwerker ("Raymond, Master Carpenter", 1880) 
 Volledige romantische werken ("Complete Romantic Works", 1885–1888)

Until 1851, when Geertruida Toussaint married Johannes Bosboom, her works were published under her maiden name (A.L.G. Toussaint). Later works and reprints of her earlier works carried her married name (A.L.G. Bosboom-Toussaint).

References

External links
 
 
 

Dutch women writers
1812 births
1886 deaths
People from Alkmaar